Rajupalem is a village in Palnadu district of the Indian state of Andhra Pradesh. It is located in Rajupalem mandal of Sattenapalli revenue division.

Government and politics 

Rajupalem gram panchayat is the local self-government of the village. It is divided into wards and each ward is represented by a ward member. The ward members are headed by a Sarpanch.

See also 
List of villages in Guntur district

References 

Villages in Guntur district
Mandal headquarters in Guntur district